Sabari is a 2007 Indian Tamil-language action film directed by Suresh. It stars Vijayakanth as the title character with Jyothirmayi, Malavika and Pradeep Rawat in supporting roles. The film was released on 16 March 2007 to mixed reviews.

Plot
Sabarivasan (Vijayakanth) is a doctor by profession and cannot tolerate injustice by any means. Nandhini (Jyothirmayi), a college student, meets Sabari and falls in love with him. Eventually they both get married. Vajravelu (Rawat) is a local criminal working for a minister (Mahadevan). Vajravelu's brother-in-law Ezhumalai (Aryan) is arrested by the police for a brutal murder. While trying to escape on the way to court, he is shot by a policeman. Vajravelu's henchmen take Ezhumalai to Sabari and force him to operate. Sabari removes the bullet, but he beats up all the henchmen and produces Ezhumalai to the police. Ezhumalai is sentenced to death and is hanged.

Vajravelu is angry and vows revenge. Vajravelu comes out on bail and kills Sabari's father (Delhi Ganesh). He also kidnaps Nandhini. Sabari fights against Vajravelu and saves Nandhini. On the way back to the hospital, Sabari is stabbed by Vajravelu's wife (Aishwarya). Vajravelu and his henchmen arrive and injure Sabari. They leave thinking Sabari is dead, but he is saved and admitted to hospital. Knowing this, Vajravelu comes in search of Sabari. Sabari fights them back and kills Vajravelu.

Cast

 Vijayakanth as Dr. Sabarivasan
 Jyothirmayi as Nandhini
 Malavika as Doctoral student
 Pradeep Rawat as Vajravelu
 Mahadevan as Minister
 Delhi Ganesh as Sabarivasan's father
 Aryan as Ezhumalai
 LIC Narasimhan as Doctor
 Scissor Manohar as Party member
 R. N. R. Manohar as Dr. Manohar
 Aishwarya as Vajravelu's wife
 Rajashree as Maragadham
 Reena as Sabarivasan's sister
 Ayyappan Gopi as Brake inspector
 Robo Chandru as Inspector Vasudevan
 Rajendranath as Commissioner of police
 Sindhu as Vajravelu's sister
 Vatsala Rajagopal as Nandhini's grandmother
 Boys Rajan as Dr. Rajan
 Mudhalvan Mahendran as Police inspector
 Theni Murugan as Arumugam
 Raviprakash as Inspector general of police 
 Vishwanth as Sri Lankan Tamil man
 Archana Harish as Sri Lankan Tamil woman

Production
The film was launched at AVM Studios in 2006. Shooting was done at locations in India including Chennai, Pondicherry and Rameswaram. Songs for the film were shotin Hong Kong.

Soundtrack
Soundtrack was composed by Mani Sharma.

Critical reception
Indiaglitz wrote, "It's Vijayakanth all the way who with his brainy and brawny ways restores order in the society." Behindwoods wrote, "All in all, disappointing is too kind a word to use for this kind of a movie. It is hard to imagine what the director, actor and producer had in mind when the movie was made." It summed up, "Sabari: an absolute dud."

References

2007 films
2000s Tamil-language films
Films scored by Mani Sharma
Indian action films
2000s masala films
Films shot in Chennai
Films shot in Hong Kong
2007 action films